Mary Kay Stein is an American mathematics educator who works as a professor of learning sciences and policy and as the associate director and former director of the Learning Research and Development Center at the University of Pittsburgh.

Education and career
Stein graduated from Pennsylvania State University in 1975, with a bachelor's degree in rehabilitation education. She stayed at Penn State for another year to earn a master's degree in counseling, and then became a staff member in the university administration. In 1980 she began her doctoral studies  at the University of Pittsburgh, and she completed a Ph.D. in educational psychology there in 1986.

She worked as a researcher in the Learning Research and Development Center at the University of Pittsburgh from 1986 to 2010, and became a faculty member in the university's Department of Administrative and Policy Studies in 1995, and was promoted to professor of learning sciences and policy in 2005.

Books
Stein is the co-author of:
Improving Instruction in Algebra: Using Cases to Transform Mathematics Teaching and Learning (with Margaret Schwan Smith and Edward A. Silver, Teachers College Press, 2005)
Improving Instruction in Geometry and Measurement: Using Cases to Transform Mathematics Teaching and Learning (with Margaret Schwan Smith and Edward A. Silver, Teachers College Press, 2005)
Improving Instruction in Rational Numbers and Proportionality: Using Cases to Transform Mathematics Teaching and Learning (with Margaret Schwan Smith and Edward A. Silver, Teachers College Press, 2005)
Reform as Learning: School Reform, Organizational Culture, and Community Politics in San Diego (with Lea Hubbard and Hugh Mehan, Routledge, 2006)
Implementing Standards-Based Mathematics Instruction: A Casebook for Professional Development (with Margaret Schwan Smith, Marjorie Henningsen, and Edward A. Silver, Teachers College Press and National Council of Teachers of Mathematics, 2000; 2nd ed., 2009)
5 Practices for Orchestrating Productive Mathematics Discussions (with Margaret Schwan Smith, National Council of Teachers of Mathematics, 2011)
5 Practices for Orchestrating Productive Task-based Discussions in Science (with Jennifer L. Cartier, Margaret Schwan Smith, and Danielle K. Ross, National Council of Teachers of Mathematics, 2013)

Recognition
In 2014, Stein was recognized as a Fellow by the American Educational Research Association.

References

External links

Year of birth missing (living people)
Living people
20th-century American mathematicians
21st-century American mathematicians
American women mathematicians
Mathematics educators
Pennsylvania State University alumni
20th-century American women
21st-century American women